The Federal Department of Finance (FDF) is one of the seven departments of the Swiss federal government. The department is headquartered in Bern and headed by a member of the Swiss Federal Council, Switzerland's finance minister. Initially, in 1848, the department was called "Department of Finance", then, from 1873 "Department of Finance and Customs", until it received its present designation in 1978.

Organisation 
The Department is composed of the following offices:

 General Secretariat, including the Federal Strategy Unit for IT (FSUIT).
 Federal Finance Administration (FFA): Responsible for the budget, financial planning, financial policy, the federal treasury and financial equalisation between the Confederation and the cantons. Operates the federal mint.
 Federal Office of Personnel (FOPER): Responsible for human resources management, personnel policy and personnel training.
 Federal Tax Administration (FTA): Responsible for federal revenue collection and the application of federal tax laws in the cantons.
 Federal Customs Administration (FCA): Responsible for monitoring the import, export and transit of goods, collecting customs duties, traffic charges and taxes.
 Swiss Border Guard, which carries out border police duties.
 Swiss Alcohol Board (SAB): Regulates the alcohol market.
 Federal Office of Information Technology, Systems and Telecommunication (FOITT): Provides IT services for the federal administration.
 Federal Office for Buildings and Logistics (FBL): Responsible for property management, central procurement of non-durable goods, federal publications and the production of the Swiss passport.
 State Secretariat for International Financial Matters

The following independent authorities are affiliated to the FDF for administrative purposes:
 Swiss Federal Audit Office (SFAO): The federal government audit office. Examines accounting practices and verifies the proper and efficient use of resources by the administration, other public service institutions and subsidy recipients.
 Swiss Financial Market Supervisory Authority (FINMA): Regulates banks, insurances, securities dealers, investment funds and stock exchanges, as well as the disclosure of shareholding interests, public takeover bids and mortgage lenders.
 Federal Pension Fund (PUBLICA): Provides insurance coverage to employees of the federal administration, the other branches of the federal government and associated organisations.

List of heads of the department 

 1848–1850: Josef Munzinger
 1851 only: Henri Druey
 1852 only: Josef Munzinger
 1853–1855: Henri Druey
 1855–1856: Josef Martin Knüsel
 1857–1858: Jakob Stämpfli
 1859–1861: Constant Fornerod
 1862–1863: Josef Martin Knüsel
 1864–1867: Jean-Jacques Challet-Venel
 1868 only: Victor Ruffy
 1869 only: Jean-Jacques Challet-Venel
 1870–1871: Paul Cérésole
 1872 only: Karl Schenk
 1872–1873: Johann Jakob Scherer
 1873–1875: Wilhelm Matthias Naeff
 1876–1878: Bernhard Hammer
 1879 only: Simeon Bavier
 1880–1890: Bernhard Hammer
 1891–1899: Walter Hauser
 1900 only: Robert Comtesse
 1901–1902: Walter Hauser
 1903 only: Robert Comtesse
 1904 only: Marc-Émile Ruchet
 1905–1909: Robert Comtesse
 1910 only: Josef Anton Schobinger
 1911 only: Robert Comtesse
 1912–1919: Giuseppe Motta
 1920–1934: Jean-Marie Musy
 1934–1938: Albert Meyer
 1939–1943: Ernst Wetter
 1944–1951: Ernst Nobs
 1952–1954: Max Weber
 1954–1959: Hans Streuli
 1960–1962: Jean Bourgknecht
 1962–1968: Roger Bonvin
 1968–1973: Nello Celio
 1974–1979: Georges-André Chevallaz
 1980–1983: Willy Ritschard
 1984–1995: Otto Stich
 1996–2003: Kaspar Villiger
 2004–2010: Hans-Rudolf Merz
 2010–2016: Eveline Widmer-Schlumpf
 2016–2022: Ueli Maurer
 2023–present: Karin Keller-Sutter

See also 
 Federal budget of Switzerland
 Federal administration of Switzerland

References

External links 
Official website

 
Finance
Switzerland
Finance
Switzerland, Finance
Finance in Switzerland